In computer science, hash tree may refer to:
Hashed array tree
Hash tree (persistent data structure), an implementation strategy for sets and maps
Merkle tree

See also 
Hash trie